Aydıncık Islands (also known as Gilindire Islands) are two small Mediterranean islands in Turkey. Their former name was Gilindire, which comes from the name of the former Roman port Kelenderis which is now  Aydıncık.

They face Aydıncık ilçe (district) center in Mersin Province. British admiral Francis Beaufort in his book Caramania points out that no ancient geographer has mentioned these islands 

The uninhabited islands are known to be the breeding ground of the  Audouin's gull (Larus audouinii).

References

Islands of Turkey
Islands of Mersin Province
Aydıncık District (Mersin)
Mediterranean islands